The Oklahoma Court System is the judicial system for the U.S. State of Oklahoma. Based in Oklahoma City, the court system is a unified state court system that functions under the Chief Justice of Oklahoma who is its administrator-in-chief. 

Under the judiciary, five types of courts function: Courts of Limited Jurisdiction, Courts of General Jurisdiction, an Immediate Appellate Court, Specials Courts, and Courts of Last Resort. Also, the Oklahoma judiciary contains two independent courts. The two Courts of Last Resort arrangement exists only in Oklahoma and neighboring Texas.

All judges and justices requiring appointment are appointed by the Governor of Oklahoma. Candidates must first go through a nominating process through the Oklahoma Judicial Nominating Commission, which selects three candidates to submit to the Governor for a single selection to the office.

Administration
The Oklahoma Supreme Court is charged with the administration of the entire state court system. The court normally exercises this responsibility through the adoption of rules governing the court system and the behavior of attorneys in state courts. The chief justice is the figure in charge of these rules.

Courts
Under the judiciary, five types of courts function: Courts of Limited Jurisdiction, Courts of General Jurisdiction, an Immediate Appellate Court, Specials Courts, and Courts of Last Resort. Also, the Oklahoma judiciary contains two independent courts. The two Courts of Last Resort arrangement exists only in Oklahoma and neighboring Texas.

The Supreme Court and Court of Criminal Appeals are courts of last resort. The Court of Civil Appeals is an intermediate appeals court. The District Courts are courts of general jurisdiction. The Workers’ Compensation Court, Court on Tax Review, and Municipal Courts are special courts with limited jurisdiction. The Court on the Judiciary and the Court of Impeachment are courts that are independent of the administration of the Supreme Court; there is no appeal from these court decisions.

Supreme Court
The Oklahoma Supreme Court is Oklahoma’s court of last resort in all civil matters and all matters concerning the Oklahoma Constitution. It consists of nine justices appointed by the governor to serve life terms, but unlike U.S. Supreme Court justices, they are subject to an election every six years in which voters choose whether or not to retain them. Each justice must be at least 30 years old, have previously been licensed as an attorney for five years, and have lived for at least one year in the Supreme Court judicial district from which they are selected.

Five of the nine justices are required to affirm, modify, or overturn any ruling of any lower court. Once the Court has reached a decision, one justice is selected to write the court’s opinion. Once published, the opinion becomes the controlling factor in the state’s law surrounding the issue(s) it addresses. This is known as "stare decisis". The justices select from among their members a chief justice and vice chief justice to serve two-year terms. 

The Oklahoma Supreme Court is also charged with the administration of the entire state court system. The court normally exercises this responsibility through the adoption of rules governing the court system and the behavior of attorneys in state courts. The chief justice is the figure in charge of these rules.

Court of Criminal Appeals
The Oklahoma Court of Criminal Appeals is the Oklahoma court of last resort involving all criminal matters. The five judges are appointed by the Governor with the judges selecting a Chief Judge at the beginning of each term of court. Like the justices of the Supreme Court, the judges serve for life but must stand for election every six years to retain their position.

Regardless of where the appeal comes from, the Court of Criminal Appeals is always the first court to hear an appeal involving the death sentence. 

Whenever there is a dispute involving whether a case falls under the jurisdiction of the Oklahoma Supreme Court or Court of Criminal Appeals, the Supreme Court determines, finally and authoritatively, which of the two courts has jurisdiction.

Court of Civil Appeals
Because the Supreme Court has neither the time nor the resources to hear all cases brought before it, the legislature created the Oklahoma Court of Civil Appeals. When a case is brought before the Supreme Court, the justices may choose to send the case to one of the four divisions of the Civil Court of Appeals, of which two are located in Tulsa and two in Oklahoma City. Each division of the court has three judges; they are appointed for life, but they must stand for election every six years to retain their positions.

Two of the three judges may choose to reaffirm, modify, or overturn any ruling of any lower court. However, if the Oklahoma Supreme Court disapproves of the court's ruling, it may review the decision.

District Courts
The backbone of the Oklahoma judiciary, the district courts, have general jurisdiction over almost all civil and criminal matters within their sphere of influence. Oklahoma has 77 district courts, each with one or more district judges and an associate district judge. The judges are elected, in a nonpartisan manner, to serve a four-year term. In the event of a vacancy in any of the district courts, the governor appoints a judge to serve until the next election.  A special judge may be appointed to assist in the event of a heavy caseload.

Oklahoma is divided into nine Judicial Administrative Districts, involving several district courts to assure a well-organized system. From the judges of the district courts, one is selected to serve as the Presiding Judge, who is responsible for the administration of their district. The Presiding Judge is answerable to the Oklahoma Supreme Court.

Candidates for district judge must be a practicing lawyer or judge for the past four years and must live in the districts in which they seek election. Associate judges must have been practicing lawyers or judges for the past two years.

Civil appeals are heard by the Oklahoma Supreme Court and criminal appeals are heard by the Oklahoma Court of Criminal Appeals.

Workers' Compensation Court of Existing Claims
The Oklahoma Workers' Compensation Court of Existing Claims is a temporary court that hears workers' compensation claims for injuries occurring before February 1, 2014.  It replaces the Workers' Compensation Court, which was dissolved by SB1062, codified in 85A O.S.  Title 85A creates a new Workers' Compensation Commission, an administrative agency to hear workers' compensation claims arising on or after February 1, 2014.  Claims submitted to the Court of Existing Claims are heard by a single judge in either Tulsa or Oklahoma City.  A party who disapproves of the judge's ruling may request a hearing en banc, and appeals from such a hearing are heard by the Oklahoma Supreme Court.  The court's mandate is scheduled to expire in 2020.

Court of Tax Review
The Oklahoma Court of Tax Review is a special court in the Oklahoma judiciary charged with hearing disputes involving illegal taxes levied by county and city governments. All tax review cases are sent to the Chief Justice of Oklahoma, who then sends the claim to the presiding judge of the administration district from which the claim originated. The presiding judge then appoints three judges to serve as the Court on Tax Review. Appeals from the court are heard by the Oklahoma Supreme Court.

Municipal Courts
With the exception of the Municipal Court of Oklahoma City and the Municipal Court of Tulsa, the Municipal Courts are courts of no record that operate under the administration of the Supreme Court but are not part of the state court system. The judges, unlike any other judge, are appointed directly by the mayors of Oklahoma's cities. The courts exist to oversee the administration of justice within cities and have jurisdiction only over the violations of city ordinances, which are criminal in nature. They have no civil jurisdiction. Appeals from Municipal Courts are heard by District Courts.

Court on the Judiciary
One of the two independent courts in the Oklahoma Judiciary, the Oklahoma Court on the Judiciary is the court responsible for removing judges from their position if they have committed illegal acts. One of three such courts in the nation (the others are in Texas and Alabama), the Court on the Judiciary insures that other courts best administer justice. 

Any judge (aside from Supreme Court justices) may be forcefully removed from office if found guilty of gross neglect of duty, corruption in office, habitual drunkenness, commission while in office of any offense involving moral turpitude, gross partiality in office, oppression in office, or other grounds as specified by the legislature. Forced retirement may occur if the court finds the judge in question to be mentally or physically incapable to perform his job. No other penalties may be imposed by this court, although other courts can hear other charges.

The Court on the Judiciary consists of a nine-member Trial Division and a five-member Appellate Division. The court’s jurisdiction may be called into force by the Governor, Attorney General, Oklahoma Supreme Court, the Oklahoma Bar Association, or by the House of Representatives. Also, private citizens can file a formal complaint against a judge to be heard by the Oklahoma Council of Judicial Complaints. It the complaint is approved, the case is heard by the Trial Division of the Court.

All cases brought before the Court are heard by the Trial Division, and any appeals from it are heard by the Appellate Divisions. There are no appeals from the Appellate Division’s decisions, and not even the Oklahoma Supreme Court may change its rulings.

Court of Impeachment
The second independent court in the Oklahoma Judiciary is the Oklahoma Court of Impeachment, which is the Senate sitting. Impeachment charges are brought by the House of Representatives, and they are heard by the Senate, with the Chief Justice of Oklahoma presiding, unless the Chief Justice or any member of the Oklahoma Supreme Court is charged, in which case the Senate shall select one of its own members to preside. 

Impeachment charges may only be brought against the Governor and all other statewide elected state officials (including the Oklahoma Supreme Court Justices) for willful neglect of duty, corruption in office, habitual drunkenness, incompetency, or any offense involving moral turpitude committed while in office.  An impeached official is suspended from duty until the conclusion of the impeachment process. Should the impeachment fail, the officer in question returns to his duties. However, if the impeachment is successful and the defendant found guilty, he is removed from office.

Officers
All judges and justices requiring appointment are appointed by the Governor of Oklahoma. Candidates must first go through a nominating process through the Oklahoma Judicial Nominating Commission, which selects three candidates to submit to the Governor for a single selection to the office.

Composition

Appellate Courts
Supreme Court

Court of Criminal Appeals

Court of Civil Appeals

Court of Military Appeals

Trial Courts

District 1
Beaver, Cimarron, Harper, Texas Counties

District 2
Beckham, Custer, Ellis, Roger Mills, Washita Counties

District 3
Greer, Harmon, Jackson, Kiowa, Tillman Counties

District 4
Alfalfa, Blaine, Dewey, Garfield, Grant, Kingfisher, Major, Woods, Woodward Counties

District 5
Comanche, Cotton, Jefferson, Stephens Counties

District 6
Caddo and Grady Counties

District 7
Oklahoma County

District 8
Kay and Noble Counties

District 9
Payne and Logan Counties

District 10
Osage County

District 11
Nowata and Washington Counties

District 12
Craig, Mayes, and Rogers Counties

District 13
Delaware and Ottawa Counties

District 14
Pawnee, Tulsa Counties

District 15
Adair, Cherokee, Muskogee, Sequoyah, Wagoner Counties

District 16
Haskell, Latimer, LeFlore Counties

District 17
Choctaw, McCurtain, Pushmataha Counties

District 18
McIntosh, Pittsburg Counties

District 19
Bryan County

District 20
Carter, Johnston, Love, Marshall, Murray Counties

District 21
Cleveland, Garvin, McClain Counties

District 22
Hughes, Pontotoc, Seminole Counties

District 23
Lincoln, Pottawatomie Counties

District 24
Okfuskee, Okmulgee, Creek Counties

District 25
Atoka, Coal Counties

District 26
Canadian County

See also
Government of Oklahoma

References

 
Government of Oklahoma
Oklahoma